Tomislav Trifić (born 4 March 1949) is a Serbian graphic artist and dean of the University of Pristina Faculty of Arts, in North Kosovo, Kosovo.

Notes and references
Notes

References

External links
 List of full professors at the University of Pristina, Retrieved on 6 June 2010
 List of academic staff at the University of Pristina Faculty of Arts, Retrieved on 10 October 2008

1949 births
Living people
People from Lipljan
Kosovo Serbs
Academic staff of the University of Pristina
University of Pristina alumni
Deans (academic)
University of Arts in Belgrade alumni